Joanna Mihułka formerly Joanna Schmidt (born 14 September 1978 in Głogów) is a Polish manager, politician and economist; is a Member of the 8th Sejm, representing the Modern party.

References

External links
Polish Sejm page for Joanna Mihułka

1978 births
Living people
Members of the Polish Sejm 2015–2019
Women members of the Sejm of the Republic of Poland
People from Głogów
Polish women economists
21st-century  Polish economists
Modern (political party) politicians
21st-century Polish women politicians